Joseph Hector Garrick (Sydney, New South Wales, 8 December 1846 — 23 February 1908), was an Australian lawyer who served as a judge on the benches of the Kingdom of Viti, the first Fijian nation-state. Having arrived in 1873, Garrick was associated with the events leading up to the cession of the islands to the United Kingdom in 1874.

Following cession, Garrick was appointed Chief Police Magistrate and Registrar General on 1 September 1875. He went on to serve as Attorney General of Fiji from 25 November 1876 to 1882.

After retiring from government service, he continued to practice Law privately in Levuka, and was still doing so as of 1889.

Personal life
Garrick was born in Sydney to James Francis Garrick and his wife Catherine Eliza Branson, both formerly of London. He was a younger brother to the New Zealand politician Francis James Garrick and the Queensland politician James Francis Garrick.

Garrick married Emily Constance Agnew in Sydney, in 1868. They had two children, Hector and Constance, but the marriage ended in divorce. On 22 July 1880, Garrick was co-respondent in a divorce suit initiated by barrister William Scott, who accused Garrick of having committed adultery with his wife, Emma Elizabeth Scott, née Milne. The court granted Scott's suit and £1000 damages. Garrick subsequently remarried to Milne in Sydney 1881; he had two more children with her — Godfrey Ernest and Gladys Neville.

Garrick died 23 February 1908.

References 

1846 births
1908 deaths
Attorneys General of the Colony of Fiji
Attorneys-general of Fiji
Colony of Fiji judges
Ethnic minority Fijian politicians
Lawyers from Sydney